Maximilian Kastner (born 3 January 1993) is a German professional ice hockey player for EHC Red Bull München in the Deutsche Eishockey Liga (DEL) and the German national team.

He represented Germany at the 2021 IIHF World Championship.

Career statistics

International

References

External links

1993 births
Living people
German ice hockey left wingers
EHC München players
SC Riessersee players
Sportspeople from Garmisch-Partenkirchen